Hypselodoris saintvincentius is a species of sea slug or dorid nudibranch, a marine gastropod mollusk in the family Chromodorididae.

Distribution
This nudibranch is known only from Southern and Southwestern Australia.

Description
Hypselodoris saintvincentius has a dark blue-black body which is covered in hundreds of small black and white spots. There is typically a creamy-white irregular, lined pattern present on its dorsum. The gills and rhinophores are orange, sometimes outlined in white.

This species can reach a total length of at least 40 mm and has been observed feeding on sponges from the genus Dysidea.

References

 Johnson, R. F. and Valdés, A. (2001) The Hypselodoris infucata, H. obscura and H. saintvincentius species complex (Mollusca, Nudibranchia, Chromodorididae), with remarks on the genus Brachyclanis Ehrenberg, 1831. Journal of Natural History 35: 1371-1398.

External links
 Hypselodoris saintvincentius page at nudipixel

Chromodorididae
Gastropods described in 1962